Linzy Cole (April 21, 1948 – September 21, 2016) was an American former professional football wide receiver who played three seasons in the National Football League (NFL) for the Chicago Bears, Houston Oilers and Buffalo Bills. He played in a total of 31 career games.  Cole was the first black football player at TCU.  At TCU, he was a First-Team All-SWC selection and the Rogers Trophy award winner. He is TCU leader in career return average in a season. He closed out his career playing in the 1969 Blue-Grey game.

References

1948 births
2016 deaths
Houston Oilers players
Buffalo Bills players
Chicago Bears players
TCU Horned Frogs football players
Players of American football from Dallas
American football wide receivers